San Francisco, officially the Municipality of San Francisco,  is a 2nd class municipality in the province of Quezon, Philippines. According to the 2020 census, it has a population of 62,097 people.

San Francisco is formerly called Aurora until 1967.

Geography

Barangays
San Francisco is politically subdivided into 16 barangays.

 Butangiad
 Casay
 Cawayan I
 Cawayan II
 Huyon-Uyon
 Ibabang Tayuman (Busdak)
 Ilayang Tayuman
 Inabuan
 Nasalaan
 Pagsangahan
 Poblacion
 Pugon
 Silongin
 Don Juan Vercelos (Utod)
 Mabunga
 Santo Niño

Climate

Demographics

Economy

See also
List of renamed cities and municipalities in the Philippines

References

External links

San Francisco Profile at PhilAtlas.com
[ Philippine Standard Geographic Code]
Philippine Census Information
Local Governance Performance Management System
Website of San Francisco, Quezon

Municipalities of Quezon